The Malaya national football team was the national team of the Federation of Malaya. The national team was active until 1962 and then it was replaced by Malaysia national football team, since the 1963 Merdeka Tournament.

Competitive record

FIFA World Cup

Olympic Games

AFC Asian Cup

Asian Games

SEA Games

Records

All-time results 
Source: World Football Eloratings
*Malaya's score listed first.

Coaches 

  G. Paul (1956)
  Neoh Boon Hean (1957)
  Choo Seng Quee (1958)
  Harun Haji Idris (1961–1962)

Achievements

International 
 Asian Games
  Bronze medal (1): 1962
 SEA Games
  Gold medal (1): 1961
  Bronze medal (1): 1959

Others 
 Pestabola Merdeka
  Winners (3): 1958, 1959, 1960*
  Runners-up (1): 1961

 Quốc Khánh Cup
  Runners-up (1): 1961

*trophy shared

Titles

References 

 
Former national association football teams in Asia